Congolese Americans are Americans descended from the peoples of the Democratic Republic of the Congo (DRC) and the Republic of the Congo, which themselves include a large variety of ethnic groups.

In the 2000 U.S. Census, 3,886 people of Congolese descent were reported. Another 1,602 specified that they were descended from people from Zaire and less than 300 people indicated that they hailed from the Republic of Congo.  Rose Mapendo, who suffered as a result of the war, has helped 2,000 refugees to emigrate into the United States through the organization Mapendo International. So, further thousands of refugees from the Democratic Republic of Congo have been able to come to the United States. In 2013, it was estimated that more than 10,000 Congolese refugees of DRC were living in the U.S.

History 
Like other Central/West African groups in the United States, the first Congolese arrived as enslaved people to what is now the United States of America as part of the Atlantic slave trade. Coming, at least, from the current Democratic Republic of the Congo, Congolese were imported to places such as Louisiana and South Carolina.
They were most likely bought in Cabinda. However, due to the difficulty of tracing specific ancestry through the Atlantic slave trade as well as the long removal of the descendants of enslaved peoples from their Congolese ancestors, very few descendants of enslaved Congolese today identify specifically as Congolese Americans.

Congolese voluntary migration to the U.S. began in the 1960s for educational reasons. Thus, the Congolese who came to the U.S. to study and got serve their "designations of origin". However, emigration from the Democratic Republic of the Congo to the United States increased in the 1970s after discovering that the dictator of this country, Mobutu Sese Seko, had decided to choose the United States, among other countries, as a place of refuge. However, in the 1980s the first large wave of Congolese immigrants came to the United States for educational purposes. Although initially  most of them had decided to return home when they finished studying in this country, many of them were forced to stay in the U.S. because of the worsening political and economic conditions in the Democratic Republic of Congo. The conflict increased in the 1990s, prompting a new wave of Congolese migrants in the United States as war refugees. Most Congolese who emigrated had to leave their homes due to war, leaving their families behind. Only a few families could migrate together. New immigrants belonged to different groups than the Tutsi (also known as Banyarwanda).

Demography 

The Congolese speak English, French, and any of the several Bantu languages. So, the Congolese community from the DRC speak, in addition to English and French, languages such as Lingala, Swahili, Kikongo, Bembe, and Tshiluba.  However, recent immigrants can speak less English than the earlier Congolese migrants. Because of this, it has been more difficult for recent immigrants to adapt to life in the United States; the earlier immigrants were better-educated. In addition, professional expertise and education that they received in the Congo are often not recognized by United States employers. Therefore, many educated Congolese have been forced to work in unskilled and low-paying jobs like dishwashing and taxi cab driving. Most Congolese are Christians.

The largest Congolese communities in the U.S. as of 2010 were Boston, New York City, and the Washington, D.C.–Baltimore area.
There is also a significant population of Congolese Americans in the Charlotte and Raleigh areas, in of the state North Carolina, in the Dallas–Fort Worth metroplex (where live 3,500 people from DRC, mainly in Arlington, Bedford, Dallas, Euless, Grand Prairie, Hurst, and Irving) in Ohio, especially around the Cleveland and Columbus areas and in Iowa, where the Congolese community of DRC this growing due to sending refugees (although quantitatively reduced in the last years). There is also a growing population in Portland, Maine. Additionally, most of the refugees in Tallahassee, Florida are from the Democratic Republic of Congo.

Since 2001, many Congolese refugees of the DRC have been resettled in the United States. So, in 2013, it was estimated that more than 10,000 Congolese refugees of DRC living in this country, more than 3,000 of which arrived to United States in 2010. USA hopes to resettle other tens of thousands of Congolese more from the same country in the next 5 years. There is a growing Congolese refugee population in Memphis, Tennessee and other cities in the state. In Kentucky, thousands of Congolese have settled in Louisville and other cities. In Bowling Green, Kentucky, Congolese refugees already comprise a sizable proportion of the city.

As of 2015–2019, the top 5 counties of settlement for immigrants from the Republic of the Congo were:

 Dallas County, Texas (2,000)
 Mecklenburg County, North Carolina (1,800)
 Tarrant County, Texas (1,200)
 Wake County, North Carolina (1,000)
 Jefferson County, Kentucky (1,000)

For the same period, the top 5 counties of settlement for immigrants from the Democratic Republic of the Congo were:

 Tarrant County, Texas (1,800)
 Mecklenburg County, North Carolina (1,600)
 Johnson County, Iowa (1,400)
 Harris County, Texas (1,400)
 Erie County, NY (1,200)

Organizations 
The Congolese Community of Chicago have as primary goal facilitate the integration of people of Congolese descent in the fabric of the United States while establish programs for give to know the Congolese culture.

Others Congolese organization in United States are Congolese Community of North Carolina-Raleigh (COCOMNC), whose goal is seek and establish programs that favor the development of Congolese children and his families living in the triangle area (Raleigh-Durham-Chapel Hill.) in the social, educational, cultural and entrepreneurial areas, Congolese Community of Houston, the charitable organization Congolese Community of Northern California  Salem Gospel Ministries providing fellowship in the DC area and Congolese Women Association of New England, which aims to provide services to Congolese women of New England, including immigration counseling, job training,  ESL classes and cultural practice workshops.

Notable people 
Democratic Republic of the Congo
 Ota Benga
 Nansha Kalonji
 Hakeem Kashama
 Arthur Katalayi
 Réjane Magloire
 Emmanuel Mudiay
 Dikembe Mutombo
 Joy Reid
 Prince Shembo
 Sandra Uwiringiyimana
 Philippe Wamba

Republic of the Congo
 Dwight Hardy

See also

 Congo Square
 Wanderer
 Congolese people in France
 Congolese people in Italy
 Congolese in the United Kingdom
 Congolese Australians
 Democratic Republic of the Congo–United States relations
 Republic of the Congo–United States relations

References

Further reading
 Beebe, Craig. "Congolese Americans." Gale Encyclopedia of Multicultural America, edited by Thomas Riggs, (3rd ed., vol. 1, Gale, 2014), pp. 531–541. online

External links 
"Congolese Americans: Finding a Home in New England"

 
 
 
 
Central Africans in the United States
Political refugees in the United States